Government cheese is processed cheese provided to welfare beneficiaries, Food Stamp recipients, and the elderly receiving Social Security in the United States, as well as to food banks and churches. This processed cheese was used in military kitchens during World War II and has been used in schools since the 1950s.

Government cheese is a commodity cheese that was controlled by the US federal government from World War II to the early 1980s. Government cheese was created to maintain the price of dairy when dairy industry subsidies artificially increased the supply of milk and created a surplus of milk that was then converted into cheese, butter, or powdered milk. The cheese, along with the butter and dehydrated milk powder, was stored in over 150 warehouses across 35 states.

History and impact
The cheese was bought and stored by the government's Commodity Credit Corporation. Direct distribution of dairy products began in 1982 under the Temporary Emergency Food Assistance Program of the Food and Nutrition Service. According to the government, it "slices and melts well." The cheese was provided monthly, in unsliced block form, with generic product labeling and packaging.

The cheese was often from food surpluses stockpiled by the government as part of milk price supports. Butter was also stockpiled and then provided under the same program. Some government cheese was made of kosher products. That cheese product is also distributed to victims of a natural disaster following a state of emergency declaration.

That cheese became an important topic for the press in the 1980s, when the press learned about the milk products that were being stored across the nation while millions of Americans felt food insecurity. During the same time in the 1980s, President Ronald Reagan's administration cut the budget on the US federal food stamp program.

"…be distributed free to the needy by nonprofit organizations." Ronald Reagan, in his official statement about the distribution of the Cheese Inventory of the Commodity Credit Corporation, said, "The 1981 farm bill I signed today will slow the rise in price support levels, but even under this bill, surpluses will continue to pile up.

As the bill stated, any state that would ask for the cheese would get  of it, in  blocks. The logic behind the distribution was to remove waste effectively and to use all possible resources available in the United States. One representative from the United States Department of Agriculture remarked, "Probably the cheapest and most practical thing would be to dump it in the ocean."

The bill, while initially receiving significant support from the divided Congress, just barely passed the Democratic-controlled House by a count of 205 for and 203 against. In the Senate, where Republicans had gained control following the 1980 elections, the bill passed much more easily with 68 votes for and 32 against.

Distribution
The distribution of government cheese was claimed to not have an adverse effect on commercially available cheeses, as the government was required to purchase dairy products like cheese to keep the commercial companies afloat. The government could then sell or give the cheese away to foreign countries. At the time of Ronald Reagan's signing of the Agriculture and Food Act of 1981, the cheese stockpile equaled more than 2 lb (1 kg) of cheese for each person living in the United States. The first dispersals of Government cheese were frequently moldy.

Those who received the cheese did not lose any food stamps and were not required to surrender food stamps for the cheese. Government cheese was provided to welfare, food stamp, and Social Security recipients at no cost to them. Government cheese was colored orange. It was distributed to low-income families through the Temporary Emergency Food Assistance Program. Government cheese was nominally removed in the 1990s when the dairy market stabilized.

Ingredients
Like traditional processed American cheese, it consists of a variety of cheese types and other ingredients, such as emulsifiers, blended together, and may be made of any of Cheddar cheese, Colby cheese, cheese curd, or granular cheese.

Nutritional value and flavor
It has been argued that people in poverty, such as those entitled to government cheese, are more likely to become obese. Between 1988 and 1994, those individuals below the poverty line had an obesity rate of 29.2 percent. The Food Security Act of 1985 (the 1985 farm bill) attempted to reduce milk production, but has been labeled as a "hodgepodge of misdirected political compromise."

It also notes that the nutritional information represents the average nutritional value of "Processed American cheese" which was offered by the commodity food program. Per serving, the total fat content is 9 g, of which 6 g are saturated fat. Per serving, there are 30 mg of cholesterol and 380 mg of sodium.

The flavor of government cheese has been compared as ranging from mild cheddar to Velveeta cheese due to variations in ingredients. Some people reminisce both good or bad opinions concerning the flavor of government cheese. Affinity for government cheese is correlated with low socioeconomic status, however this correlation also overlaps with who was most likely to receive and consume it.

21st century
This purchase also added revenues for the dairy producers. Regarding the purchase, Agriculture Secretary Tom Vilsack said, "This commodity purchase is part of a robust, comprehensive safety net that will help reduce a cheese surplus that is at a 30-year high while, at the same time, moving a high-protein food to the tables of those most in need. USDA will continue to look for ways within its authorities to tackle food insecurity and provide for added stability in the marketplace."

Currently, as part of the USDA Food Nutrition Service Commodity Supplemental Food Program (CSFP), eligible seniors over the age of 60 are provided one  block of processed cheese food each month, supplied by participating dairies.

See also

 Butter mountain
 Emergency Food Assistance and Soup Kitchen-Food Bank Program
 Special Milk Program
 Supply management (Canada)

References

American cheeses
Charity in the United States
Political terminology of the United States
United States Department of Agriculture
Processed cheese